Alydda or Aludda was a town of ancient Phrygia, inhabited in Roman and Byzantine times. It was mentioned in the Peutinger Table as Aludda, which places it 30 M.P. from Clanudda and 25 M.P. from Agmonia.

Its site is unlocated.

References

Populated places in Phrygia
Former populated places in Turkey
Roman towns and cities in Turkey
Lost ancient cities and towns
Populated places of the Byzantine Empire